Borok-1 is a rural locality (a village) in Ustretskoye Rural Settlement, Syamzhensky District, Vologda Oblast, Russia. The population was 32 as of 2002.

Geography 
Borok-1 is located 29 km northwest of Syamzha (the district's administrative centre) by road. Borok-2 is the nearest rural locality.

References 

Rural localities in Syamzhensky District